Johnnie Mae Matthews (December 31, 1922 – January 6, 2002) was an American blues and R&B singer, songwriter, and record producer from Bessemer, Alabama. Known as the "Godmother of Detroit Soul" and as the first African American female to own and operate her own record label (Northern Recording Company) she was an early influence on the careers of many of the now-famous recording stars who began their careers in Detroit, Michigan such as Otis Williams, David Ruffin, and Richard Street of the Temptations, Jimmy Ruffin, Joe Hunter of the Funk Brothers Band, Richard Wylie, Norman Whitfield, Berry Gordy, founder of Motown Records, Timmy Shaw, Barbara Lewis, Bettye LaVette and many more.

Early life and career
Johnnie Mae Matthews was born December 31, 1922, in Bessemer, Alabama. She learned to sing in her church choir, and also performed with her mother at military bases throughout the Deep South. When she was twelve years old, the family relocated to New Jersey, and in 1947 Matthews left her parents home and moved to Detroit, Michigan where she married and started her own family. In 1957 she joined a local quintet called the Five Dapps, assuming lead vocals on "You're So Unfaithful," which was the B-side of their 1958 debut single, "Do Wop a Do". The Instrumental backing on the record was done by pianist Joe Hunter, who would frequently collaborate with Matthews in the years to follow, and later led Motown's famed studio band, the Funk Brothers.

1950s
In 1958, Matthews formed her own record label, Northern Recording Company. Headquartered in an office at 2608 Blaine in Detroit, just a few blocks from her home, she used $85 (US$ in  dollars), borrowed from her husband's paycheck, to become the first African-American woman to own and operate her own label. With sessions typically recorded at either nearby Special Studio, or at radio station WCHB, Northern Recording Company was largely used as a vehicle to launch her own solo recording career. Her first release, "Dreamer", in 1959, was credited to Johnnie Mae Matthews & the Daps. Her follow-up single, "Mr. Fine", featured on its B-side, a song named "Someday", which was a solo tune by local singer Chet Oliver.

Motown Records founder, Berry Gordy has often credited Matthews with teaching him the ropes of the recording industry. He acknowledged her assistance in helping land a distribution deal with Chess Records for The Miracles' 1959 hit "Bad Girl". Matthews also fostered the early careers of such future Motown stars as David and Jimmy Ruffin. Some say that she is the uncredited author of Mary Wells’ breakthrough hit, "Bye Bye Baby." It is impossible to know how differently Matthews' own recording career might have turned out had she accepted any of invitations of Berry Gordy to record for Motown, particularly during the mid-1960s, when she was delivering some of her finest material, most notably "Lonely You'll Be" and "Cut Me Loose," in 1967, the latter of which was subsequently licensed for national distribution on the Atco label.

1960s
In her 1960 tune, "So Lonely," Matthews dropped the Dapps altogether. She then, quickly followed up with her second solo, "Ooh Wee Baby." On both of these recordings she was backed by a band called the Groovers, a group that was led by Joe Hunter, and also included bassist James Jamerson, guitarist Eddie Willis, saxophonist Eli Fontaine, and drummer Uriel Jones, all of whom would become staples of Motown's greatest sessions as members of the, now famous, Funk Brothers Band. Northern also nurtured the early career of Richard Wylie whose backup group, the Mohawks, included Norman Whitfield who later became one of Motown's most visionary songwriters and producers.
 
Also in 1960, the label issued "Come On," the debut single by The Distants who were later renamed The Temptations. Mr. Bo's debut single, "I'm Leaving This Town", was also released on the label that year. In time, Northern spun off a series of sister labels, most notably Reel, which was the label of several of Matthews’ singles, such as "Oh, Baby",  "No One Can Love Me the Way You Do",  "The Headshrinker", and "Come Home", all of which were released in 1961. In 1963, Reel issued "I Don't Want Your Love", a duet that paired Matthews and Timmy Shaw, her longtime songwriting collaborator. Shaw is best known for his 1964 solo effort, "Gonna Send You Back to Georgia", a song which was later recorded by The Animals and a few other artists. However, Matthews' biggest hit, "My Little Angel", in 1962, appeared, not on her own labels, but rather on the New York-based Sue label.

In 1963 she hired manager Ollie McLaughlin, who had previously launched the career of Barbara Lewis. McLaughlin brought Matthews to the attention of Mercury Records’ new Blue Rock subsidiary, where he eventually produced both of her singles for that label, "Baby, What's Wrong", and "My Man (The Sweetest Man in the World)". He also produced her lone Spokane label effort, "Worried About You". During the late 1960s Matthews also cut a series of singles for her Big Hit label, including "I Have No Choice", "My Momma Didn't Lie", and "Don't Be Discouraged".

1970s
However, as the decade of the sixties came to a close, so did Northern Recording Company and all of her subsidiaries, and as the 1970s were being ushered in, Matthews turned her attention to Black Nasty, an up-and-coming funk group that featured two of her children, Artwell Jr. and Audrey. In 1973, Matthews produced the band's only album, Talking to the People, which was released on the Stax record label.
 
Black Nasty was later renamed the ADC Band, and the group resurfaced in 1978 with the R&B smash "Long Stroke" written by Michael Moneystone Judkins who greatly influenced the success of the ADC Band with help in writing from Audrey Matthews.  Encouraged by their success, Matthews revived Northern Recording Company around this time, with the ADC Band supplying the musical backing on the disco-inspired tune "It's Good", which was later re-issued on the Cotillion label for national distribution. After one final Northern effort, 1980's "I Can Feel It," she closed the label for good, effectively ending her recording career.

1990s
Johnnie Mae Matthews was portrayed by Vanessa Bell Calloway in the 1998 television miniseries The Temptations.

Death
Matthews died after a long battle with cancer on January 6, 2002. She was 79 years old.

Discography

BRAX (The Five Dapps) – Do Whop A Do / You're So Unfaithful – 1958

NORTHERN 3727 – Dreamer / Indian Joe – 1959

NORTHERN 3729 – Mr Fine / Someday – 1959

NORTHERN 3736 – Ooh Wee / Give Me True Love – 1960

NORTHERN 3742 – So Lonely / Help Me – 1960

REEL 3743 – Oh, Baby / You Worry Me – 1960

GLODIS 1004 – Oh, Baby / You Worry Me – 1960

REEL 3745 – No One Can Love Me / No More Tears – 1961

REEL 112 – The Headshrinker / My Little Angel – 1961

SUE 755 – The Headshrinker / My Little Angel – 1962

REEL 119 – Oh Mother / Come Home – 1962

REEL 120 – (With Timmy Shaw) I Don't Want Your Loving (Parts 1 & 2) – 1963

REEL 122 – Lonely Road / I Won't Cry Any More – 1963

NORTHERN 4736 – No Body Business (What I Do) / My Destination (It True Love) – 1963

SPOKANE 4008 – Worried About You / Itty Bitty Heart – 1964

BLUE ROCK 4001 – Baby What's Wrong / Here Comes My Baby – 1964

BLUE ROCK 4011 – My Man / Can't Live Without You – 1965

BIG D 855 – Don't Talk About My Man / He Really Loves Me – 1965

AUDREY 100 – Luck Walked Through My Door / Love Hides All Faults – 1966

AUDREY 112 – (With Joe L. Carter) My Life Story / Don't Cry Baby – 1966

JAM 103 – Lonely You'll Be / That's What My Man is For – 1967

ART 002 – (& The Wonderetts) Cut Me Loose / Lonely You'll Be – 1967

ATCO 6528 – (& The Wonderetts) Cut Me Loose / Lonely You'll Be – 1967

ART 003 – Got to be on (Your Case) / You're the One – 1967

BIG HIT 104 – Two-sided Thing / You Make Me Feel Good – 1968

BIG HIT 105 – I Have No Choice / That's When it Hurts – 1969

BIG HIT 108 – My Momma Didn't Lie / You're The One – 1970

BIG HIT 111 – Don't be Discouraged / Don't be Discouraged – 1971

COTILLION – ADC Band – Long Stroke – 1978

COTILLION – ADC Band – Talk that Stuff – 1979

COTILLION – ADC Band – Renaissance – 1980

COTILLION – ADC Band – Brother Luck −1981

COTILLION – ADC Band – Roll with The Punches – 1982

NORTHERN 10039 – It's Good / Come on Back – 1979

COTILLION 45010 – It's Good / Come on Back – 1979

NORTHERN 10040 – I Can Feel It / Crazy About You – 1980

Further reading
 Dancing in the street: Motown and the culture politics of Detroit – Suzanne E. Smith – 
 Standing in the shadows of Motown: The life and music of James Jamerson – James Jamerson – 
 Motown: Music, money, sex, and power – Gerald Posner – 
 Temptations – Otis Williams –

References

External links
 Johnnie Mae Matthews Award Presentation from the city of Detroit
 Johnnie Mae Matthews/Atco Records
 Temptation's Movie

1922 births
2002 deaths
20th-century African-American women singers
American soul musicians
Record producers from Michigan
Songwriters from Michigan
20th-century American singers
Singers from Detroit
20th-century American women singers
American women record producers
Deaths from cancer in Michigan
African-American songwriters
21st-century African-American people
21st-century African-American women